Lee Boo-jin (born 1970) is a South Korean billionaire businesswoman who has been serving as the president and chief executive of Hotel Shilla, one of Seoul's leading hotels and conference centers. Lee has been dubbed by the media as "Little Lee Kun-hee" and is regarded as a successful businesswoman for her work in Hotel Shilla. She is the younger sister of Samsung Electronics executive chairman Lee Jae-yong, and the older sister of Lee Seo-hyun, Chairman of Samsung Welfare Foundation.

Early life
She is the daughter of Lee Kun-hee, the late billionaire chairman of Samsung Group. She graduated from Daewon Foreign Language High School, a prestigious Korean high school. She earned a bachelor's degree from Yonsei University, majoring in children's studies.

Career
Lee began her career at Samsung Welfare Foundation in 1995.

In 2001, she joined Hotel Shilla, a member company of the Samsung Group, specializing in travel retail and the hospitality business. She has been the president and CEO of Hotel Shilla since December 2010.

Lee formerly served as president of Corporate Strategy for Samsung Everland and an advisor for the trading department of Samsung C&T from December 2010 to December 2015, with the two companies merging to become Samsung C&T Corporation in September 2015.

She also previously served as an Independent Non-Executive Director of CITIC Limited from 2014 to 2019.

As of February 2023, her net worth was estimated at US$3.3 billion.

Since 2015, she has been ranked on Forbes' lists of the World's 100 Most Powerful Women.

Personal life
She lives in Seoul, South Korea.

In 1999, she married Im Woo-jae, known in the South Korean press as "Mr. Cinderella" because of his humble background, as an "employee of a security service affiliate of Samsung Group". They separated in 2012, and have one son together.

In a court ruling in July 2017, Lee was ordered to pay her ex-husband Im Woo-jae $7.6 million, as part of their divorce settlement, with Lee receiving sole custody of their son. Im allegedly counter-sued and sought $1.1 billion as a division of assets, one of the largest amounts ever requested in an asset split trial in South Korea. Their divorce was settled in January 2020 with Lee ordered to pay Im $12.1 million in an asset split.

References

Living people
South Korean billionaires
1970 births
Female billionaires
Yonsei University alumni
Women chief executives
Lee family (South Korea)
Samsung people